Edric "Eddie" Leadbeater (15 August 1927 – 17 April 2011) was an English cricketer who played in two Tests in 1951. He was born in Lockwood, Huddersfield, West Riding of Yorkshire, and died in Huddersfield.

Leadbeater was a right-handed lower order batsman, and a leg-break and googly bowler, who had a couple of good seasons for Yorkshire in 1950 and 1951, but failed to keep his place in the side. He reappeared for Warwickshire County Cricket Club in 1957 and 1958, as a possible replacement for Eric Hollies, who retired after the 1957 season; but he failed to take enough wickets and his contract was not renewed.

Leadbeater's leg-spin was always inclined to be expensive: in his two good seasons for Yorkshire, his wickets cost an average of around 25 runs apiece. His selection to replace Derbyshire's injured Bert Rhodes on the 1951-52 Marylebone Cricket Club (MCC) tour of India, Pakistan and Ceylon was unexpected, and though he played in two Test matches, he was not a success. Cricket writer, Colin Bateman, noted "Leadbeater was more of an accurate roller, than a traditional leg spinner and his bowling posed few terrors for the Indian batsmen". Wisden Cricketer's Almanack reported that he modified his action to avoid being too expensive on the tour: however, he was never the same bowler again, and the rest of his first-class career produced fewer than 100 wickets.

Dropping out of the Yorkshire side, he joined Warwickshire for 1957 and played fairly regularly in 1958 after Hollies retired. Though he took just 49 wickets (and only 25 of them in Championship matches), he scored his only first-class century in what proved to be his last season: going in as a nightwatchman, he made 116 and shared in a second-wicket stand of 209 with Fred Gardner in the match against Glamorgan at Coventry.

Leadbeater is a rarity as an England Test cricketer, in that he was never awarded a county cap.

After leaving first-class cricket, Leadbeater played regularly for Almondbury Cricket Club in the Huddersfield Cricket League, taking over 1,000 wickets before he retired at the age of 68.

References

 Cricketarchive.co.uk
 Wisden, 1950 to 1959 editions

1927 births
2011 deaths
England Test cricketers
English cricketers
Yorkshire cricketers
Warwickshire cricketers
Cricketers from Huddersfield
Marylebone Cricket Club cricketers